The following is a list of the 426 communes in the French department of Haute-Marne.

The communes cooperate in the following intercommunalities (as of 2020):
Communauté d'agglomération de Chaumont
Communauté d'agglomération de Saint-Dizier Der et Blaise (partly)
Communauté de communes d'Auberive Vingeanne et Montsaugeonnais
Communauté de communes du Bassin de Joinville en Champagne
Communauté de communes du Grand Langres
Communauté de communes Meuse Rognon
Communauté de communes de l'Ouest Vosgien (partly)
Communauté de communes des Savoir-Faire (partly)
Communauté de communes des Trois Forêts

References
INSEE Haute-Marne communes

Haute-Marne